Thomas More College is an independent, co-educational day school located in Kloof, near Durban in KwaZulu-Natal, South Africa.

History

Thomas More College can trace its origins to modest beginnings when on 1 February 1962 it opened its doors to only 55 pupils, all boys. Co-education was not to come for another 14 years. The founder and headmaster was Robin Savory, who had long had a dream of starting a Catholic School run by Catholic laity. In this he had the support of Archbishop Denis Hurley. So, from the start the school had a strong religious element, strengthened in later years with a broader Christian base. The school was named after Saint Thomas More at the request of Chris Hurley, co-founder, second headmaster and brother of Archbishop Denis Hurley.

The choice of Kloof as the site for the Thomas More School (as it was originally called) was due to the availability of the Great House, and the presence of a small core of likely pupils. However, at the time Kloof was indeed a village with a scattering of shops within easy reach of what was then a functioning railway station. What today are flourishing residential areas were then largely open grasslands, and Kloof High School was in fact Kloof Secondary, as in 1962 it only went as far as Standard 7 (Grade 9 in modern parlance). Between 1962 and 1992 (by which time the school's name had changed to the present Thomas More College) the school was served by three headmasters: Robin Savory, Chris Hurley and Bill Pickering. Much was achieved in that time, notably the acquisition of considerable tracts of land, some of which carried buildings which have remained part of the central core of the school.

However, attendance numbers never rose above 197, comprising around 100-110 boarders, with the balance being 'day-boys'. This was despite the school going co-educational in 1976. By 1990 the school was facing closure. A vigorous campaign was launched, not only to revive it, but to promote its expansion.

A major step in this direction was the establishment of a Primary School based in the Farmhouse. In 1992 Peter Habberton was appointed as principal, and in 1993 the Junior Primary School opened, based in the Farmhouse and led by Jacquie Habberton. Hilton Stander joined as Primary School Headmaster the following year, followed by Greg Brooks in 1999, Nigel Sloane in 2005, and Barbara Taljard in 2009. Much expansion in terms of buildings and other facilities took place and, thanks to the generosity of Peter Savory, the Robin Savory Pavilion was erected above the Savory Field. The boarding facility closed at the end of 2002 due to a significant drop in demand, and the rooms which became available as a result were converted to offices and specialist classrooms.

In 2002 Shane Cuthbertson followed Peter Habberton as Principal. In 2009, due to re-structuring in the High School, Shane retained his position as Principal of the whole school, and Allan Chandler, Senior Master at the time, was appointed as Headmaster of the High School. Expansion continued, attention being focussed on improving the sporting facilities, notably a new hockey field, an all-purpose field and netball courts, and at the end of 2006 a 25m x 35m swimming pool was completed. The Ken Mackenzie Centre appeared on the other side of the Savory Field. To date the facilities include 6 computer labs, upgraded High School library, laboratories and classrooms - the majority of which have smartboards, projectors and Apple TV, two heated swimming pools, an Astro Turf, Indoor Sports Centre and Music School. Recent improvements to the gardens and all the wonderful facilities have contributed to making this one of the most beautiful school campuses in the country. 

Pupil numbers in recent years have been recorded to have risen to 1224, from Grade 0000 to Grade 12, making Thomas More College the largest independent co-educational school in KwaZulu-Natal.

Jubilee (50 year) celebrations took place in 2012 with the school enjoying multiple celebratory events across all phases throughout the year.  

After Mr Chandler's retirement in 2015, Dave Wiggett joined as High School Headmaster at the start of 2016.  In the same year, as a result of additional classrooms and demands on the Primary School, it was separated into a Foundation Phase led by Deni Hornsey, while the Senior Primary remained under Barbara Taljard's leadership.  Both Mrs Taljard and Mrs Hornsey retired in 2020.  Mrs Anny Breedt was then appointed Junior Primary Headmistress, beginning her role in January 2021, while Mr Balarin who had already served as Deputy Head: Senior Primary, was appointed Headmaster: Senior Primary beginning his role in January 2021.

The College celebrates 60 years this year (2022), a relatively young school when compared to the local monastic schools in the Upper Highway, Thomas More College continues to be pioneers in the educational sector. 

TMC bid farewell to Mr Dave Wiggett, High School Headmaster of 6 and a half years (2016-July 2022).  Dave will be remembered for his forward-thinking leadership, energy and inspiring change within the College, across all phases.  

We welcomed Mr Davies to TMC on 1 September 2022 in the position of High School Headmaster.  Mr Davies brings with him a wealth of knowledge and decades of experience in the educational space.

Today
Today Thomas More is a co-educational, interdenominational Christian-based school accepting pupils from Grade 0000 to Grade 12. Its boarding establishment closed in 2002.
The school is situated on a conservancy estate of 20 hectares and has 1 163 pupils.
All pupils are put into houses (Hurley, Savory, or Dalberg) that compete against each other in events such as the interhouse galas and sports day as well as cultural events.

The Long Walk
The Long Walk (originally called "the fifty mile walk") is a tradition of Thomas More College. The first "fifty mile walk" was in March 1963 and was instigated and organised by Michael Leffler who was a staff member when the school opened in 1962, and remained as House Master of the boarding school until his retirement in the early 1980s. Michael Leffler's inspiration for the walk came from John F. Kennedy in 1962, when he challenged his fellow Americans to walk a  event annually. In March every year, approximately 1 300 students, parents, past pupils, teachers and other visitors set off in the hope of completing the 80 km.

The earliest walks were from Pietermaritzburg to Greytown, away from Kloof. In the early 1960s there were no more than 30 participants on the Long Walk. Later walks still started in Pietermaritzburg, but students would then walk 80 km toward the coast, finishing at the school. It was easier than the walk to Greytown because there were fewer steep hills to walk up. In the 1970s, the walk started from, and finished in, the school grounds, with the bell adjacent to The Great House being rung when finishers arrived. In 1974, due to an error, the distance walked was 86 kilometers and only 21 people out of 350 starters finished the walk.

The current route starts from the school grounds in Kloof, and winds its way through the suburbs of Kloof and Hillcrest, before finishing back at the school Kloof.

From 2004, the finish was moved to Summerveld. In 2016 the route finish returned to TMC due to various safety concerns in the Summerveld area.

The Long Walk is becoming extremely popular with more and more people taking part therein, and attracts participants from all over KwaZulu-Natal as well as the rest of South Africa.  In 2020, 2021 & 2022 the school was forced to cancel the Long Walk due to COVID-19 restrictions on mass gatherings.  The Long Walk returns in March 2023 with Covid restrictions having been lifted across South Africa.

Sports

Thomas More is known for its competitiveness in terms of sports. Although neither the high school nor senior primary have the same number of pupils as the other single-sex schools in the greater Durban area, the school's teams are able to provide tough competition. The 1st cricket, hockey and waterpolo sides are regarded as some of the best in the area, while some players of individual sports have gained provincial colours.

The 1st Team Waterpolo sides (Boys' 1st and Girls' 1st) embarked on a successful tour to Serbia in 2010, whilst the 1st Team Cricket and Rugby sides regularly go on tours. The 1st hockey teams also compete annually in at various tournaments across the country and have travelled internationally for various training camps.

Academics
TMC pupils write the Independent Examinations Board (IEB) exams.

Compulsory subjects include:
English
Afrikaans or isiZulu (as a first additional language)
Life Orientation
Mathematics Core or Mathematics Literacy

The students are also required to take at least three other subjects of their choice:
Accounting
AP Mathematics (Additional Subject)
AP English (Additional Subject)
AP Science (Additional Subject)
Business Studies
Design
Dramatic Arts
Engineering Graphics & Design (EGD)
Geography
History
Information Technology (IT)
Life Sciences (Biology)
Marine Science (Additional Subject)
Physical Science
Visual Arts

School of Music
Thomas More College has its own dedicated school of music.
The School of Music at Thomas More College offers tuition for beginners to advanced pupils, and is open to all pupils in the Upper Highway community as well as adults.
Exams are offered through Trinity College as well as Royal Schools in all practical and theoretical aspects of music.
The following instruments are offered (private tuition):
Piano
Drums
Guitar
Flute
Violin
Voice training

Past Pupils’ Association

The origins of the Past Pupils' Association can be traced back to 1973. Since co-education was not to come until 1975, it was the Thomas More Old Boys' Association that was formed with the dual aim of fostering relations between the Old Boys and the School, and amongst the Old Boys themselves. After 1976, when the first girls matriculated, the scope of the association was broadened. Glen Bruton was the first chairman.

In later years, the chairman was co-opted onto the School Board. Rob Brislin and Dunstan Farrell, both lawyers, served in this capacity. Among achievements of those days were the forming of Cricket and Hockey Clubs, two teams in each case, and the establishment of a clubhouse in an old building, more or less on the site of the present clubhouse.

In the 1980s and early 1990s, the association was struggling, but things changed circa 1998, when the Robin Savory Pavilion was built. Thanks to the initiatives of John Kearey and Roy Alderdice, this facility came under the control of the Thomas More Past Pupils' Association and was administered by that body in close co-operation with the school.

Apart from the Pavilion, the association is active in several spheres, and under the energetic leadership of the present chair, Melanie Küster, it is flourishing. The Men's hockey teams continue to operate and a Ladies' team has been added. The Moorcock Chronicle, sent to everyone on the database, serves both as a mouthpiece for the Past Pupils and as a link with the school. The association co-hosts the annual Past Pupils' Association Day.

Notes

External links

Christian schools in South Africa
Educational institutions established in 1962
Private schools in KwaZulu-Natal
EThekwini Metropolitan Municipality
1962 establishments in South Africa